El Puente de Sabiñánigo is a locality located in the municipality of Sabiñánigo, in Huesca province, Aragon, Spain. As of 2020, it has a population of 37.

Geography 
El Puente de Sabiñánigo is located 47km north of Huesca.

References

Populated places in the Province of Huesca